Maolra Seoighe (English: Myles Joyce), Cappancreha, County Galway, was a man who was wrongfully convicted and hanged on 15 December 1882. He was found guilty of the Maamtrasna Murders and was sentenced to death. The case was heard in English, though Seoighe's first language was Irish. His wife referred to him as 'Myles Joyce' in a letter she wrote to the Freeman's Journal appealing for his release. He was posthumously pardoned in 2018.

Maamtrasna murders
Maolra Seoighe was the most prominent figure in a controversial trial in 1882 that took place while Ireland was part of the United Kingdom. Three Irish language speakers were condemned to death for the murder of a local family (John Joyce, his wife Brighid, his mother Mairéad, his daughter Peigí and son Mícheál) in Maamtrasna, on the border between County Mayo and County Galway. It was presumed by the authorities to be a local feud connected to sheep rustling and the Land War. Eight men were convicted on what turned out to be perjured evidence and three of them condemned to death: Maolra Seoighe (a father of five children), Pat Casey and Pat Joyce.

Covering the incident, The Spectator wrote the following:

The Tragedy at Maamtrasna, investigated this week in Dublin, almost unique as it is in the annals of the United Kingdom, brings out in strong relief two facts which Englishmen are too apt to forget. One is the existence in particular districts of Ireland of a class of peasants who are scarcely civilised beings, and approach far nearer to savages than any other white men; and the other is their extraordinary and exceptional gloominess of temper. In remote places of Ireland, especially in Connaught, on a few of the islands, and in one or two mountain districts, dwell cultivators who are in knowledge, in habits, and in the discipline of life no higher than Maories or other Polynesians.

The court proceedings were carried out in a language they did not understand (English), with a solicitor from Trinity College Dublin, who did not speak Irish. The three were executed in Galway by William Marwood for the crime in 1882. The role of John Spencer, 5th Earl Spencer, who was then Lord Lieutenant of Ireland, is the most controversial aspect of the trial, leading most modern scholars to characterise it as a miscarriage of justice; research carried out in the British archives by Seán Ó Cuirreáin, has found that Spencer "compensated" three alleged eyewitnesses to the sum of £1,250, equivalent to €157,000 (by 2016 rates).

To date, the Spencer family and the British government have issued no apology or pardon for the executions, though the case has been periodically taken up by various political figures. The then MP for Westmeath, Timothy Harrington, took up the case, claiming that the Crown Prosecutor for the case George Bolton, had deliberately withheld evidence from the trial. In 2011, two sitting members of the British House of Lords, David Alton and Eric Lubbock from the Liberal Democrats, requested a review of the case. Crispin Blunt, Tory Parliamentary Under-Secretary of State for Prisons and Youth Justice, stated that Seoighe was "probably an innocent man", but that he would not be seeking an official pardon.

On 4 April 2018 Michael D. Higgins, the President of Ireland, issued a pardon on the advice of the government of Ireland saying "Maolra Seoighe was wrongly convicted of murder and was hanged for a crime that he did not commit". It is the first presidential pardon relating to an event predating the foundation of the state in 1922 and the second time a pardon has been issued after an execution.
The case of Maolra Seoighe is not an isolated one, and there are strong similarities with the case of Patrick Walsh who was hanged in Galway jail on 22 September 1882 just three months before Maolra for the murders of Martin and John Lydon. The same key players and political factors were active in both cases and his conviction is just as questionable as that of Maolra

Media
In September 2009, the story featured on RTÉ's CSI programme under an episode entitled CSI Maamtrasna Massacre. A dramatised Irish-language film regarding the affair, entitled Murdair Mhám Trasna, produced by Ciarán Ó Cofaigh was released in 2017.

See also
 List of miscarriage of justice cases
 Guildford Four
 Birmingham Six
 Land War

References

Bibliography

External links
 Feall Fuilteach - Scéal Mhaolra Seoighe BBC Radio Ulster 
 http://www.gaelport.com/default.aspx?treeid=163&EventItemID=2000
 http://www.advertiser.ie/galway/article/57300/remembering-myles-joyce
 https://archive.org/stream/maamtrasnamassac00harr/maamtrasnamassac00harr_djvu.txt
 http://gaeilge2013.ie/wp-content/uploads/2012/12/Clár-Ócáid-Mhám-Trasna.pdf 
 http://www.advertiser.ie/galway/article/21496
 http://irishcriminology.com/05b.html
 http://www.beo.ie/alt-ceacht-staire-ar-chearta-teanga-dunmharuithe-mham.aspx 
 Maamtrasna Murders - Legal Injustice at AnGhaeltacht.net

People from County Galway
1842 births
1882 deaths
People executed by the Kingdom of Ireland by hanging
People executed for murder